The Man from the Alamo is a  1953 American Western film directed by Budd Boetticher and starring Glenn Ford, Julie Adams and Chill Wills.

Plot
During the siege at the Alamo, John Stroud (Glenn Ford) is chosen by lot to leave the fort and check on his family and warn other families of the mission's defenders of the impending arrival of General Santa Anna. But when everyone who stayed at the Alamo is wiped out by the Mexicans, Stroud is therefore branded a coward. When Stroud returns to his family, he finds that they have all been killed. Stroud takes the initiative to help other families move to safety from the pursuit of Wade, a Santa Anna sympathizer.

Cast
 Glenn Ford as John Stroud
 Julie Adams as Beth Anders 
 Chill Wills as John Gage
 Hugh O'Brian as Lieutenant Lamar
 Victor Jory as Jess Wade
 Neville Brand as Dawes
 John Daheim as Cavish 
 Myra Marsh as Ma Anders
 Jeanne Cooper as Kate Lamar
 Marc Cavell as Carlos 
 Edward Norris as Mapes
 Guy Williams as Sergeant
 Arthur Space as Lieutenant Colonel William Barrett Travis
 Stuart Randall as Jim Bowie
 Trevor Bardette as Davy Crockett
 Dennis Weaver as Reb
 Ethan Laidlaw as Citizen (uncredited)
 Jack Mower as Patriot (uncredited)

References

External links
 
 
 
 

1953 films
1953 Western (genre) films
American Western (genre) films
Films directed by Budd Boetticher
Films shot in California
Texas Revolution films
Universal Pictures films
Cultural depictions of Davy Crockett
Films scored by Frank Skinner
1950s English-language films
1950s American films
Cultural depictions of James Bowie